Dein Mani-Yut (commonly known as Amat Dein (အမတ်ဒိန်, "Minister Dein") or as Amat Tein (အမတ်တိန်, "Minister Tein")) was co-chief minister of Hanthawaddy during the reign of King Razadarit (1384–1421). He was also a senior general, and held key governorship posts at Syriam (1370s–1408), Bassein (1408–1415) and Sittaung (1415–1420s). Along with his colleague Byat Za, Dein was instrumental in Razadarit's reunification campaigns of the Mon-speaking kingdom in the late 1380s, as well as the Forty Years' War against the Burmese-speaking Ava Kingdom.

Early career
According to the chronicle Razadarit Ayedawbon, he was a senior minister of the court of King Binnya U at the king's death in 1384. He was then known as Tein Nge (lit. "Tein the Young") or Amat Dein/Tein (lit. "Minister Dein/Tein"). Dein or Tein was the title which he received when the king appointed him governor of Syriam (modern Thanlyin). The appointment probably took place no earlier than the mid-1370s.

Dein lost control of Syriam in mid 1383 when Binnya U's son Binnya Nwe raised a rebellion during the king's long illness. He belonged to the faction of the court that remained loyal to the king while another faction, led by Senior Minister Zeik-Bye, secretly supported Nwe's rebellion. Dein did not offer support to Nwe even when the dying king handed over the power in October 1383 to his elder sister (and Nwe's adoptive mother) Princess Maha Dewi. It was only after the king's death that the court, including Dein, offered the throne to Nwe who ascended the throne with the title of Razadarit.

In a famous episode, the 16-year-old new king reportedly questioned why Dein offered support only now, and why he should not be executed. The minister famously replied that his only "crime was being a servant of your father, the king." He continued that because he had sworn to be loyal to Binnya U, he would have fought Razadarit or anyone else to death to defend Binnya U; however that after his lord's death, he acknowledged Razadarit as the rightful successor, and was willing to serve the new king with the same kind of loyalty and resolve. The reply won him a stay. After deliberating with his advisers, the young king decided that he needed the support and expertise of the court, and restored Dein's post at Syriam.

Razadarit years

Gaining Razadarit's trust
In the beginning, Dein was not yet part of Razadarit's inner circle. The new king continued to rely on his advisers from the rebellion days to face off several challenges to his authority. (At his accession, Razadarit controlled only the Pegu-Syriam-Dagon corridor in the Pegu province. Other vassals had either refused to pledge allegiance, or declared outright independence (in the cases of Viceroys Byattaba and Laukpya).) When Viceroy Laukpya of Myaungmya invited the northern Ava Kingdom to invade the south to touch off what would become known the Forty Years' War in 1385, Dein was yet not part of the leadership. It was only in the second campaign of 1386–1387 that Dein was given command of a 500-strong force to defend Hlaing; he outlasted Ava attacks on the town for over a month. In 1388, Dein, along with Byat Za, finally entered the king's inner circle after the duo's performance in the military campaign that conquered the Martaban Province (approximately, modern Mon State and southern Kayin State) on the upper Tenasserim coast. The duo further cemented their position when they successfully conquered the Irrawaddy delta in 1389–1390, giving Razadarit full control of all three provinces of the kingdom.

Co-chief minister–general (1388–1413)
From then on, Dein and Byat Za became the king's chief ministers and generals. The chronicle Razadarit Ayedawbon contains several episodes that portray Byat Za and Dein (and the court) as the adults who guided and tempered the ambitious, brash king. Dein and Byat Za were the most senior members of the regime after the king, and often represented the kingdom. They were the ones Razadarit sent to Siam to receive the white elephant presented by the king of Ayutthaya. In general, the king relied on the duo for their advice even if he did not always listen to them. For their part, Dein and Byat Za dutifully carried out the tasks even when they did not fully agree with the decision. In one famous episode, in 1390, the king assigned Dein the ignominious task of asking Razadarit's first wife Queen Tala Mi Daw to give up her family heirlooms to be given to his favorite Chief Queen Piya Yaza Dewi. Dein did not want the task; he was sobbing before Tala Mi Daw when he asked for the heirlooms. A deeply hurt Tala Mi Daw committed suicide.

Dein and Byat Za complemented each other. While Dein was the more experienced court administrator, he was second-in-command to Byat Za in military matters. The Razadarit reports a rare disagreement between Dein and Byat Za in 1408 over Pegu's defensive formations against the upcoming invasion by Ava; the king chose Dein's more conservative formation over Byat Za's, and appointed Dein as co-commander. After the successful defense, the king upgraded Dein's title to Dein Mani-Yut, (lit. "Jewels that Shine Like the Sun").

In addition to their ministerial duties, Dein and Byat Za were also responsible for the defense of their fiefdoms. In 1408, Razadarit transferred Dein from Syriam to Bassein, a strategic delta port, and gateway to the western kingdom of Launggyet (Arakan). The appointment came right after Hanthawaddy forces had dislodged Ava-appointed king Anawrahta of Launggyet. Dein and Byat Za, who had been governor of Myaungmya, another key delta port, were now responsible for defending the delta against upcoming Ava invasions. The duo successfully fended off Ava's reinvigorated invasion of the delta by Crown Prince Minye Kyawswa in 1410–1411.

Chief minister (1413–1421)
After Byat Za's death in 1413, Dein became the most senior minister. He officially remained an active general at least until the 1414–1415 dry season. (In 1414, he co-commanded the defenses of the delta with Prince Binnya Dhammaraza though in October he left the front to join the king and did not see action.) He may also have officially given up his gubernatorial position at Bassein in 1412 to Prince Binnya Bassein (lit. "Lord of Bassein") although Dein remained responsible for the administration and defense of Bassein and the northern delta until 1415. (Bassein apparently was a profitable trading hub. In 1414, when Minye Kyawswa tried to lure Dein to defect, Dein replied that he as ruler of Bassein was allowed to keep tax revenues up to 100,000 ticals of bronze annually, and that he doubted Ava could offer anything close to it.) He still commanded respect from the Ava high command; Crown Prince Minye Kyawswa called him an "old, wise general". The crown prince immediately launched an attack on Bassein after learning that Dein was no longer guarding Bassein.

At any rate, most of his responsibilities in the 1410s were as the king's chief minister and adviser. In 1413, he reaffirmed the alliance with the northern Shan state of Hsenwi (Theinni), and sought an alliance with Chiang Mai (Lan Na) by sending diplomatic missions. He was the king's main military adviser in the 1414–1415 campaign. After having received intelligence of Ava's planned massive invasion, Dein in October 1414 successfully convinced the king to leave the capital Pegu until things settled down. Later, in March 1415, when Pegu's first counterattack on Dagon (modern downtown Yangon) failed, Dein persuaded the king not to execute the two commanders of the mission, but instead to give them a second chance to lead another attack again, which was successful. The battle of Dagon set up the famous battle of Dala–Twante in which Crown Prince Minye Kyawswa fell in action. After the battle, Dein tried to get a senior Ava commander Nawrahta of Salin, a son of Viceroy Laukpya of Myaungmya, to defect by promising the governorship of Myaungmya. But his overtures were rejected by Nawrahta, who reaffirmed his allegiance to Ava.

Dein spent the rest of the years mostly at Pegu. He was reassigned to Sittaung as governor by the king who wanted his old minister to be close to the capital. He remained chief minister for the rest of the reign of Razadarit, who died in 1421. According to the Mon Yazawin chronicle by Shwe Naw, Chief Minister Dein did not take sides in the subsequent power struggle between Prince Binnya Dhammaraza and Prince Binnya Ran; as the chronicle puts it: the old minister left the "two main gates of the capital open". It was the last mention of him in the chronicle; it does not state whether Dein remained in office in the following years.

Family
Chronicles do not mention any immediate family members of Dein. He did have a nephew named Sanda-Yathi, who served under him at Bassein.

List of campaigns
The following is a list of Dein's military campaigns as reported in the chronicles.

See also

Notes

References

Bibliography
 
 
 
 
 
 
 
 

14th-century births
15th-century deaths
Government ministers of Myanmar
Burmese generals
Burmese people of Mon descent